Henry Bird (22 May 1800 – 1864) was an English professional cricketer who played first-class cricket from 1819 to 1826 for Cambridge Town Club, making 6 known appearances in first-class matches.

References

1800 births
1864 deaths
English cricketers
English cricketers of 1787 to 1825
English cricketers of 1826 to 1863
Cambridge Town Club cricketers
People from South Cambridgeshire District
People from Chesterton, Cambridge